Krasilnikovia cinnamomea is a bacterium species in the genus Krasilnikovia.

Nomenclature
The genus is named after Russian microbiologist Nikolai Aleksandrovich Krasil'nikov (1896–1973). The species epithet, cinnamomea, is a New Latin adjective meaning cinnamon-colored.

References

External links
Type strain of Krasilnikovia cinnamomea at BacDive -  the Bacterial Diversity Metadatabase

Micromonosporaceae
Bacteria described in 2007
Monotypic bacteria genera